1956 Olympics refers to both:

The 1956 Winter Olympics, which were held in Cortina d'Ampezzo, Italy
The 1956 Summer Olympics, which were held in Melbourne, Australia with equestrian events in Stockholm, Sweden